Aleksandr Shibayev may refer to:

 Aleksandr Shibayev (footballer) (born 1961), Russian football coach and former player
 Aleksandr Shibaev (ice hockey) (born 1987), Russian ice hockey player
 Alexander Shibaev (table tennis) (born 1990), Russian table tennis player